Craving is a 2018 Dutch comedy film directed by Saskia Diesing. It is based on the book of the same name, written by Esther Gerritsen. In July 2018, it was one of nine films shortlisted to be the Dutch entry for the Best Foreign Language Film at the 91st Academy Awards, but it was not selected.

Cast
 Simone Kleinsma as Elisabeth
 Elise van 't Laar as Coco
 Leopold Witte as Hans
 Stefan de Walle as Wilbert

References

External links
 

2018 films
2018 comedy films
Dutch comedy films
2010s Dutch-language films